You've Got It may refer to:
 You've Got It (Simply Red song), 1989
"You've Got It", a song by Billie Piper on her 1998 album Honey to the B
"You've Got It", a song by Bruce Springsteen on his 2012 album Wrecking Ball
"You've Got It", a song by Greg Sczebel on his 2004 album Here to Stay

See also
"You Got It", a song by Roy Orbison
 Got It (disambiguation)